Aleksandr Aleksandrovich Sukhov (born 3 January 1986) is a Russian professional footballer. He plays as a right-back for FC Ufa.

Club career
He made his debut in the Russian Premier League in 2006 for FC Moscow.

Honours
 Russian Cup finalist: 2007.

Career statistics

References

External links
 

1986 births
Footballers from Moscow
Living people
Russian footballers
Association football midfielders
Association football defenders
FC Moscow players
FC Shinnik Yaroslavl players
FC Ufa players
Russian Premier League players
Russian First League players